Kňovice is a municipality and village in Příbram District in the Central Bohemian Region of the Czech Republic. It has about 300 inhabitants.

Administrative parts
The village of Kňovičky and the hamlet of Úsuší are administrative parts of Kňovice.

Gallery

References

Villages in Příbram District